A number of Allied ships were damaged by kamikaze attacks during World War II.

 USS Aaron Ward (DM-34) (May 1945)
 USS Achernar (AKA-53) (April 1945)
 USS Achilles (ARL-41)
 USS Alpine (APA-92)
 USS Ammen (DD-527)
 USS Anthony (DD-515)
 USS Apache (ATF-67)
 
 
 USS Bache (DD-470)
 USS Barry (DD-248)
 USS Belknap (DD-251)
 USS Belleau Wood (CVL-24)
 USS Bennett (DD-473)
 USS Birmingham (CL-62)
 USS Bowers (DE-637)
 USS Borie (DD-704)
 USS Braine (DD-630)
 USS Bright (DE-747)
 USS Brooks (DD-232)
 USS Bryant (DD-665)
 USS Bullard (DD-660)
 USS Bunker Hill (CV-17)
 USS Butler (DD-636)
 USS Cabot (CVL-28)
 USS Caldwell (DD-605)
 USS California (BB-44)
 USS Callaway (APA-35)
 USS Cassin Young (DD-793)
 USS Champion (AM-314)
 USS Chase (DE-158)
 USS Claxton (DD-571)
 USS Colorado (BB-45)
 USS Columbia (CL-56)
 USS Comfort (AH-6)
 USS Cowell (DD-547)
 USS Daly (DD-519)
 USS Devilfish (SS-292)
 USS Dickerson (DD-157)
 USS Dorsey (DD-117)
 USS Douglas H. Fox (DD-779)
 USS DuPage (APA-41)
 USS England (DE-635)
 USS Enterprise (CV-6)
 USS Essex (CV-9)
 USS Evans (DD-552)
 USS Facility (AM-233)
 
 USS Forrest (DD-461)
 USS Franklin (CV-13)
 USS Gansevoort (DD-608)
 USS Gilligan (DE-508)
 USS Gregory (DD-802)
 USS Guest (DD-472)
 USS Gwin (DM-33)
 USS Haggard (DD-555)
 USS Halloran (DE-305)
 USS Hambleton (DD-455)
 USS Hancock (CV-19)
 USS Hank (DD-702)
 USS Haraden (DD-585)
 USS Harding (DD-625)
 USS Haynsworth (DD-700)
 USS Hazelwood (DD-531)
 USS Henrico (APA-45)
 USS Hinsdale (APA-120)
 USS Hobson (DD-464)
 USS Hodges (DE-231)
 USS Hopkins (DD-249)
 USS Hornet (CV-8) 1942 Battle of Santa Cruz in the first Kamikaze attack  
 USS Howorth (DD-592)
 USS Hughes (DD-410)
 USS Hunt (DD-674)
 USS Hyman (DD-732)
 
 USS Ingraham (DD-694)
USS Intrepid (CV-11)
 USS Isherwood (DD-520)
 USS J. William Ditter (DM-31)
 USS Kadashan Bay (CVE-76)
 USS Kalinin Bay (CVE-68)
 USS Keokuk (CMc-6)
 USS Kidd (DD-661)
 USS Kimberly (DD-521)
 USS Kitkun Bay (CVE-71)
 SS Kyle V. Johnson
 USS La Grange (APA-124)
 USS Laffey (DD-724)
 USS Lamson (DD-367)
 USS Leutze (DD-481)
 USS Liddle (DE-206)
 USS Lindsey (DM-32)
 USS Long (DD-209/DMS-12)
 USS Louisville (CA-28)
 USS Loy (DE-160)
 USS LSM(R)-189
 USS LST-884
 USS Mahnomen County (LST-912)
 USS Manila Bay (CVE-61)
 
 USS Marcus Island (CVE-77)
 USS Maryland (BB-46)
 USS Mississippi (BB-41)
 USS Montpelier (CL-57)
 USS Morris (DD-417)
 USS Mullany (DD-528)
 USS Nashville (CL-43)
 USS Natoma Bay (CVE-62)
 USS Nevada (BB-36)
 USS New Mexico (BB-40)
 USS New York (BB-34)
 USS Newcomb (DD-586)
 USS O'Neill (DE-188)
 USS Orestes (AGP-10)
 USS Pathfinder (AGS-1)
 USS Pinkney (APH-2)
 USS Prichett (DD-561)
 USS Purdy (DD-734)
 USS Rall (DE-304)
 USS Ralph Talbot (DD-390)
 USS Randolph (CV-15)
 USS Ransom (AM-283)
 USS Rathburne (DD-113)
 USS Rednour (APD-102)
 USS Reno (CL-96)
 USS Riddle (DE-185)
 USS Rodman (DD-456/DMS-21)
 USS Roper (DD-147)
 USS Salamaua (CVE-96)
 USS Samuel S. Miles (DE-183)
 USS Sandoval (APA-194)
 USS Sangamon (CVE-26)
 USS Santee (CVE-29)
 USS Savo Island (CVE-78)
 USS Sederstrom (DE-31)
 USS Shubrick (DD-639)
 USS Sims (DE-154)
 USS Smith (DD-378) 1942 Battle of Santa Cruz in the first Kamikaze attack 
 USS Sonoma (AT-12)
 USS Southard (DD-207)
 USS Spectacle (AM-305)
 USS St. George (AV-16)
 USS St. Lo (CVE-63) 1943 Battle of Leyte Gulf as the first warship sunk by a Kamikaze attack
 USS St. Louis (CL-49)
 USS Stafford (DE-411)
 USS Suwannee (CVE-27)
 USS Taluga (AO-62)
 USS Telfair (APA-210)
 USS Tennessee (BB-43)
 USS Terror (CM-5)
 USS Thatcher (DD-514)
 USS Ticonderoga (CV-14)
 USS Twiggs (DD-591)
 USS Tyrrell (AKA-80)
 HMS Venerable (R63)
 USS Wadsworth (DD-516)
 USS Walke (DD-723)
 USS Wesson (DE-184)
 USS White Plains (CVE-66)
 USS Whitehurst (DE-634)
 USS William D. Porter (DD-579)
 USS Wilson (DD-408)
 USS Witter (DE-636)
 USS Zeilin (APA-3)

References

Kamikaze
Kamikaze